The 1997 World Women's Curling Championship (branded as 1997 Ford World Women's Curling Championship for sponsorship reasons) was held at Allmend Stadium in Bern, Switzerland from April 12 to 20, 1997.

Teams

Round-robin standings

Round-robin results

Draw 1

Draw 2

Draw 3

Draw 4

Draw 5

Draw 6

Draw 7

Draw 8

Draw 9

Tiebreaker

Playoffs

Brackets

Final

References
 

World Women's Curling Championship
Curling
Ford World Women's Curling Championship, 1997
Women's curling competitions in Switzerland
International sports competitions hosted by Switzerland
Sports competitions in Bern
April 1997 sports events in Europe
20th century in Bern